Endre A. Balazs (10 January 1920 – 29 August 2015) was a Hungarian inventor who transformed a natural lubricant into a palliative for arthritic knees. He devoted seven decades to exploring the therapeutic potential of hyaluronic acid. He was enlisted in the New Jersey Inventors Hall of Fame in 2012.

Biography
He was born in 1920, in Budapest, Hungary. His father was an engineer at the Budapest Waterworks until the communist takeover after World War II. 

He graduated from the University of Budapest in 1942 and started his research career at the Department of Histology and Embryology of the university. In 1947, he continued his research at the Karolinska Institutet in Stockholm. He was the director of ophthalmic research at Columbia-Presbyterian Medical Center, from 1975 to 1982. 

He died on August 29, 2015, in Saint-Tropez, France.

Philanthropy
He endowed a professorship at the Karolinska Institute.

References

1920 births
2015 deaths
Hungarian medical researchers
Hungarian expatriates in the United States
Hungarian expatriates in Sweden
Hungarian expatriates in France